Nemacheilus banar is a species of ray-finned fish in the genus Nemacheilus, it has currently only been recorded in Vietnam but it may occur also in Laos.

Footnotes 

 

B
Fish described in 2001